Naut’sa mawt Tribal Council is a First Nations Tribal Council located in British Columbia, Canada, with offices in Tsawwassen and Nanaimo. NmTC advises and assists its 11-member Nations in the areas of Community Planning, Economic Development, Financial Management, Governance and Technical Services (which includes community infrastructure, capital projects, housing development and inspections, water quality and emergency preparedness.) NmTC is also actively involved in fostering dialogue and understanding between its members and their neighbouring communities.

The member Nations of the region span the Strait of Georgia, touch the Strait of Juan de Fuca and encompass eastern and southern Vancouver Island, the Lower Mainland and the Sunshine Coast.

The head office of the Tribal Council is on Snuneymuxw First Nation lands in Nanaimo. A mainland office is located on Tsawwassen First Nation lands near the Tsawwassen area of the city of Delta.

Member governments
Halalt First Nation, Crofton, BC 
Homalco First Nation, Campbell River, BC
Klahoose First Nation, Cortes Island, BC
Malahat First Nation, Mill Bay, BC
Nanoose First Nation, Lantzville, BC
Sliammon First Nation, Powell River, BC
Snuneymuxw First Nation, Nanaimo, BC
Stz'uminus First Nation, Ladysmith, BC 
Tsawwassen First Nation, Tsawwassen, BC
Tsleil-Waututh First Nation, North Vancouver, BC
T'sou-ke First Nation, Sooke, BC

Board of directors

In 2012-13 the Tribal Council Board is composed of:

Executive
 Doug White, Snuneymuxw First Nation - Chair
 Terry Sampson, Stz'uminus First Nation - Vice-Chair 
 Gordon Planes, T'Sou-ke First Nation - Secretary Treasurer

Other Directors

 Bryce Williams, Tsawwassen First Nation
 Lawrence Mitchell, Nanoose First Nation
 Russell Harry, Malahat First Nation
 James Delorme, Klahoose First Nation
 James Thomas, Halalt First Nation
 Carleen Thomas, Tsleil-Waututh First Nation
 Bill Blaney, Homalco First Nation
 Walter Paul, Sliammon First Nation

Klahowya online newspaper 
NmTC publishes an online newspaper, ''Klahowya - the voice of the member nations of the Naut'sa mawt Tribal Council."

See also
Coast Salish peoples
Halkomelem (language)
Comox language
Squamish language
North Straits Salish 
Te'mexw Treaty Association
List of tribal councils in British Columbia

References

External links
Naut'sa mawt Tribal Council website

Vancouver Island
Lower Mainland
Sunshine Coast (British Columbia)
First Nations tribal councils in British Columbia